Vibert Durjan (born 31 July 1948) is a Guyanese cricketer. He played in one first-class match for British Guiana in 1968/69.

See also
 List of Guyanese representative cricketers

References

External links
 

1948 births
Living people
Guyanese cricketers
Guyana cricketers
Sportspeople from Georgetown, Guyana